Marcel Granollers and Santiago Ventura were the defending champions but decided not to participate.
Mahesh Bhupathi and Leander Paes clinched the title. They defeated Robin Haase and David Martin 6–2, 6–7(3–7), [10–7] in the final.

Seeds

Draw

Draw

References
 Main Draw

2011 Aircel Chennai Open
Aircel Chennai Open - Doubles
Maharashtra Open